Macro BIM (Building Information Model) is a building information model, assembled of higher level building elements, used for macro level analysis including visualization, spatial validation, cost modeling/estimating, phasing/sequencing, energy performance, and risk.
 
Macro models are intended to be built quickly, facilitating rapid analysis of multiple concepts or ideas prior to launching into a more detailed in depth study of a preferred concept using "Micro BIM" applications.
 
Macro BIM authoring applications often utilize parametric variables and properties as well as inferencing capabilities to quickly build enough relevant data to facilitate analysis.

References

Building technology